The Miriam Barnert Hebrew Free School was dedicated on September 27, 1904 in Paterson, New Jersey by Nathan Barnert. The school offered instruction in biblical and post-biblical Jewish history.

References

Schools in Passaic County, New Jersey
Educational institutions established in 1904
Education in Paterson, New Jersey
Defunct schools in New Jersey
1904 establishments in New Jersey